Turgis may refer to:

Surname
Agathe Turgis (fl. 1892–1936), French fencer
Anthony Turgis (born 1994), French cyclist
Claude Turgis de Saint-Étienne de la Tour, French colonist in Acadia
Thomas Turgis (1623–1704), English politician

Places
Stratfield Turgis, a village and civil parish in the English county of Hampshire
Turgis Green, a hamlet in the civil parish
 Lieu-Turgis (Le), a hamlet at la Cambe, Normandy  
Turgis (crater), on Saturn's moon Iapetus

See also
Sturges, a surname
Sturgis (surname)
Turgi, a municipality in the canton of Aargau, Switzerland
Hamel-Tourgis (Le), hamlet at Montchauvet, Calvados, Normandy
Tourgéville (Torgisvilla in 1185), a French commune in Normandy

Surnames of Norman origin